The 2018–19 Lechia Gdańsk season is the club's 75th season of existence, and their 11th continuous in the top flight of Polish football. The season covered the period from 1 July 2018 to 30 June 2019.

Season information

On 9 February 2019 Lechia wore their first ever non-green or non-white kit for a home match in the Ekstraklasa. The team wore an all black kit in respect to Paweł Adamowicz, the mayor of Gdańsk, who was a lifelong Lechia fan who was murdered on 14 January 2019.

Players

First Team Squad 

 

 

 

 
 
 

Key

Out on loan

Transfers

In

Out

Retired

Competitions

Friendlies

Summer

Winter

Ekstraklasa

Regular season

League table

Championship round

League table

Polish Cup

Statistics

Goalscorers

References

External links

Lechia Gdańsk seasons
Lechia Gdańsk